Curio ficoides, syn. Senecio ficoides, also known as skyscraper Senecio and Mount Everest Senecio, is a species of succulent plant, in the genus Curio (Asteraceae), indigenous to South Africa.

Description

A succulent, spreading shrub, it reaches over 1 meter in height. The brittle, succulent branches lose their leaves lower down. 
The leaves are blue-green to blue grey, pruinose, succulent, erect, tapering and flattened laterally, with translucent lines down both sides. 
The flower capitula have no ray florets, and appear on a terminal, branching inflorescence.

Relatives
This is a polyploid species (2n=100). However, its closest relatives are Curio repens, Curio radicans, Curio herreanus, and Curio hallianus, which have a variable number of chromosomes. 

It is easily confused with Curio talinoides, which has a similar growth habit. However, the leaves of C.talinoides are rounded-cylindrical in cross section. In contrast, the leaves of C. ficoides are usually somewhat knife-like, flattened laterally.

References

External links

ficoides
Flora of Southern Africa
Garden plants of Southern Africa